Tushar Saha (born 20 September 1985) is an Indian first-class cricketer who plays for Tripura.

References

External links
 

1985 births
Living people
Indian cricketers
Tripura cricketers
Cricketers from Tripura
People from Agartala